Barbee Boys are a successful 1980s Japanese rock band. The band debuted in 1984 and was popular through the 1980s, becoming the first Japanese rock band to perform at the Nippon Budokan, until disbanding in 1992. The five members were: Konta (real name Atsushi Kondou), male vocals and soprano sax; female vocalist Kyoko Sekihara; lead guitarist and songwriter Tomotaka Imamichi, who went on to have a career as a songwriter for other bands; bassist and pianist Enrique; and drummer Toshiaki Konuma. The band played a reunion concert in 2008. In 2019, they announced their first release in 29 years, PlanBee, to be released on December 18.

Discography
1st Option（1985）
Freebee（1985）
3rd Break（1986）
Listen!（1987）
√5（1989）
Eeney meeney barbee moe（1990）
PlanBee (2019)

References

Japanese rock music groups
Musical groups established in 1984